John Cyril Malloy (June 1930 – March 2, 2014) was an American politician. He served as a member for the 113th and 118th districts of the Florida House of Representatives.

Malloy was born in Jackson, Tennessee. He moved to Chicago, Illinois and attended Northwestern University, earning a law degree in 1957. He then moved to Miami, Florida in 1959 to work as a patent attorney, establishing his own law firm. He was president of the South Florida chapter of the Federal Bar Association, and an adjunct professor at the University of Miami School of Law, teaching intellectual property law.

In 1972 Malloy was elected as a Republican member for the 113th district of the Florida House of Representatives, serving until 1974. In 1976 he was elected for the 118th district, becoming a Democratic member in 1977. He served until 1980.

Malloy died in March 2014 in Coral Gables, Florida, at the age of 83.

References 

1930 births
2014 deaths
People from Jackson, Tennessee
Members of the Florida House of Representatives
Florida Republicans
Florida Democrats
20th-century American politicians
Northwestern University alumni